Frances Elliot may refer to:
 Frances Reed Elliot, the first African American woman accepted into the American Red Cross Nursing Service
 Frances Minto Elliot, English writer